Federal Route 206, or Jalan Batu Melintang-Kalai, is a federal road in Kelantan, Malaysia.

Features

At most sections, the Federal Route 206 was built under the JKR R5 road standard, allowing maximum speed limit of up to 90 km/h.

List of junctions and towns

References 

Malaysian Federal Roads